Suppe or von Suppé is a surname. Notable people with the surname include:

Franz von Suppé (1819–1895), Austrian composer
Frederick Suppe (born 1940), American philosopher
John Suppe (born 1942), American geologist

See also
 Suppes